Robert Glen Craddock (born April 24, 1931), was an American politician who was a Democratic member of the Nevada General Assembly. He was a construction supervisor.

Educated: Church Hill High, Church Hill, Tennessee;

Memorial High School, San Diego, California;

engineering trade school, Massena, New York.

Children: Jay Gregory and Robert Michael.

Military: U.S. Navy, 4 years. Damage Control; Deep Sea Diver

Recreation: Hiking, hunting and fishing.

Legislative Service: Nevada Assembly,

1973-79-four regular sessions of the legislature.

Affiliations:

 Carpenters Local No. 1780; president,
 Sunrise Manor Protective Association.
 Personal and Professional Achievements:
 Supervised multimillion dollar construction projects;
 Vocational teaching certificates.
 Nevada First Aids Legislation
 Chairman of the Education Committee;

Committees:

 Taxation, Government Affairs, Health & Welfare, Assessment & Taxation of Geothermal Resources & Rectification of Nevada Education Laws

References

2. https://www.leg.state.nv.us/Division/Research/Publications/InterimReports/1979/Bulletin79-21.pdf

1931 births
Living people
Nevada Democrats
People from the Las Vegas Valley